The Brisbane Heat are an Australian cricket club who play in the Big Bash League, the national domestic Twenty20 competition. The club was established in 2011 as an inaugural member of the eight-club league. The Big Bash League consists of a regular season and a finals series of the top four teams. This list includes players who have played at least one match for the Heat in the Big Bash League and the Champions League Twenty20.

When the Big Bash League was established in 2011 a salary cap of $1 million was set for every club with a limit of two contracted international players. As of 2013 Brisbane Heat had eighteen full Contracts available, and for the 2020/21 season has nineteen contracted players. Players not contracted to the club may also be named as supplementary players and represent the Heat, and can also be signed on rookie contracts to train with the team.

List of players
Players are listed according to the date of their debut for the Heat. All statistics are for Big Bash League and Champions League Twenty20 only.
 Statistics up to date as of 29 November 2022
 The number to the left of player name represents 'cap'. For players who debuted for club in the same match, player caps are ordered by that of the batting order.
 Currently contracted players names are in bold.
 Hover over column headings for key

Other players
Listed below are players who have been associated with the Heat but have not played for the club.

See also
 Brisbane Heat
 Big Bash League
 Champions League Twenty20

References

Lists of Australian cricketers
Big Bash League lists
Heat